The Gambia Workers' Confederation is a trade union centre in The Gambia. It is affiliated with the International Trade Union Confederation.

History 
The Gambia Worker's Confederation was founded in 1985 with M.E. Jallow as its first secretary general, notably the secretary general of the banned, Gambia Workers' Union. The next secrerary general was Pa Moudo Faal.

ICTUR reports that secretary general Pa Moudou K.B. Faal was arrested by the National Investigation Agency in both December 1996 and April 1997 when he planned to travel abroad.

References

Trade unions in the Gambia
International Trade Union Confederation

1985 establishments in the Gambia